Moʻale Finau (born February 10, 1960) is a Tongan politician and Member of the Legislative Assembly of Tonga. 

He is a member of the Democratic Party of the Friendly Islands.

Finau has a Master of Arts degree in Geography and a Certificate in Law.  He worked as a teacher, businessman and leadership training officer before entering politics.  He stood unsuccessfully as an independent for the seat of Haʻapai in both the 2005 and 2008 general elections. In the 2010 general election he stood in the new Haʻapai 12 constituency for the Democratic Party of the Friendly Islands, and was elected with 31.9% of the vote. He lost the seat by 4 votes in the 2014 election.

In February 2015 Finau was appointed Governor of Ha'apai. In May 2016 he was charged with careless driving after injuring a man while driving in Tongatapu. In September 2017 the Auditor-General found that he had unlawfully spent T$150,000 from  a community development fund on his own projects.

He was re-elected to the Legislative Assembly in the 2017 Tongan general election. He lost his seat again in the 2021 Tongan general election. He was re-elected in the 2022 Ha’apai 12 by-election.

References

1960 births
Living people
Members of the Legislative Assembly of Tonga
Democratic Party of the Friendly Islands politicians
People from Haʻapai
Governors of Haʻapai